Rear Admiral Frank Trojahn (born 20 August 1963) is a Danish naval officer.

As of 1. June 2021 Rear Admiral Frank Trojahn is defence attaché at the Royal Danish Embassy in Washington D.C. The defence attaché reports to the Danish Ministry of Defence, other military authorities, and the Danish Ministry of Foreign Affairs on the position of the United States and Canada with regards to defence and national security policy. Other responsibilities include assisting in foreign military sales.

Rear Admiral Frank Trojahn is from Soenderborg close to the Danish-German border. He graduated from the Royal Danish Naval Academy in 1986. He completed the German Staff Course in 1999 and was promoted to Flag Rank in 2013 when he was appointed Admiral Danish Fleet.

At sea, Rear Admiral Trojahn began his career in minelayers and minesweepers serving as Executive and Commanding Officer. In 2007 he was appointed Commanding Officer of the frigate HDMS ABSALON. During his tour as Commanding Officer, the ABSALON was deployed on its first operational deployment when it served as Flag Ship of Task Force 150 under the Combined Maritime Forces in Bahrain. The mission was primarily counter piracy operations near the Horn of Africa. Upon completion of his tour of duty as Commanding Officer, he was promoted to captain and assumed command of the 2nd Danish Squadron, where the IVER HUITFELDT and ABSALON-class frigates are organized.

Ashore, Rear Admiral Trojahn has served in the Danish Ministry of Defence and as Deputy Defence Attaché at the Royal Danish Embassy in Berlin, Germany. He has served as both Branch and Division head within Defence Planning in the Danish Defence Command.

In 2013 he was promoted to Rear Admiral and was appointed Admiral Danish Fleet (Chief of the Royal Danish Navy). During his time in command, a new training regime was incorporated within the Royal Danish Navy, when it was decided to use the British Royal Navy's Flag Officer Sea Training syllabus to improve the combat effectiveness of the major Danish warships. Furthermore, an agreement was reached to deploy an IVER HUITFELDT-class frigate to a US Carrier Strike Group.

During his time as Admiral Danish Fleet, Rear Admiral Trojahn also served as Commander of a Danish-Norwegian-UK Task Force, which was the maritime part of the operation to remove and destroy Syria's chemical weapon stockpiles in 2013–2014.  

In 2017 Rear Admiral Trojahn transferred to the Danish Defence Command as Chief of Staff Plans and Capabilities. In this capacity he has overseen defence planning, policy, strategy and capability development including implementation of defence agreements.

In addition to campaign medals, Rear Admiral Trojahn's personal awards include French and German awards as well as the Danish Commander of the order of Dannebrog.

Rear Admiral Trojahn is married to Christina Trojahn, they have two adult daughters.

CAREER      

1986   Lieutenant

1991   Lieutenant Commander

1999   Commander

2005   Commander, Senior Grade

2009   Captain

2013   Rear Admiral

ASSIGNMENTS            

1986-1995: Duty at sea in minelayers and minesweepers including positions as Executive Officer and Commanding Officer.

1995-1997: Staff Officer Operations, Mine Warfare Squadron

1999-2002: Staff Officer, Ministry of Defence

2002-2005: Deputy Defence Attaché, Berlin Germany and Liaison Officer to the Joint Forces Operations Command

2005-2009: Head of Planning Branch, Defence Command Denmark

2007-2008: Commanding Officer Frigate HDMS ABSALON

2009-2010: Commander 2nd Squadron, Royal Danish Navy

2010-2013: Chief of Planning Division, Defence Command Denmark

2013-2017: Admiral Danish Fleet/Chief of Naval Staff

2017-2021: Chief of Staff Plans and Capabilities, Defence Command Denmark

2021-          Defence attaché (Military-, Naval, and Air), Washington D.C.      

EDUCATION

1989-1991: Junior Staff Course, Defence Academy Denmark

1992: Maritime Tactical Course, UK

1995: Mine Warfare Staff Officers Course, Belgium

1997-1999: Staff Course, German Staff College, Hamburg Germany

2013: Chief of Defence Security Policy Course

2014: NATO Generals, Flag Officers and Ambassadors Course (2014-2)

MAJOR AWARDS AND DECORATIONS:

Commander of the Order of Dannebrog (2014)

Medal of Merit, 25 years of service in the Navy

Defence Medal for International Service

Defence Medal for International Service (1948-2009)

Medal of Merit of the Home Guard

The Order of Merit of the Federal Republic of Germany, 1st class

Class of The Nordic Blue Berets Medal of Honour, Silver

Ordre National de la Légion D´Honneur, Officer

(Current as of August 2021)

References

Knights of the Order of the Dannebrog
Officers Crosses of the Order of Merit of the Federal Republic of Germany
1963 births
Danish admirals
Chiefs of the Royal Danish Navy
Living people